This article contains character information for the American teen drama, Privileged. The series is based on the Alloy Entertainment book How to Teach Filthy Rich Girls by best-selling author Zoey Dean. The series focuses mainly on the character of Megan Smith (JoAnna Garcia), a recent Yale graduate who has been hired to tutor two spoiled rich twins, Rose (Lucy Hale) and Sage Baker (Ashley Newbrough) in a wealthy area of Palm Beach, Florida. Other characters include friends and family members of Megan and the twins.

Main characters
The following are characters who have led the plot, as listed in the order of the opening television credits of each episode.

Recurring characters

Minor characters

References

Lists of drama television characters
Lists of American television series characters